Agustín González Pereira (born 25 January 1997) is a Uruguayan footballer who plays as a midfielder for Swiss club Schaffhausen.

Club career
On 28 July 2021, he signed a two-year contract with Schaffhausen in Switzerland.

References

External links
Profile at Euro Sport

1997 births
Footballers from Montevideo
Living people
Uruguayan footballers
Association football midfielders
Club Nacional de Football players
Sud América players
Montevideo City Torque players
C.A. Progreso players
FC Schaffhausen players
Uruguayan Primera División players
Swiss Challenge League players
Uruguayan expatriate footballers
Expatriate footballers in Switzerland
Uruguayan expatriate sportspeople in Switzerland